The 1999 IPSC Handgun World Shoot XII held in Cebu, Philippines was the 12th IPSC Handgun World Shoot. Eric Grauffel of France became Open World Champion, Pavel Jasansky of the Czech Republic became Modified World Champion and Michael Voigt of the United States took the Standard World Champion title.

Champions

Open 
The Open division had the largest match participation with 362 competitors (52.8 %).

Individual

Teams

Modified 
The Modified division had the third largest match participation with 74 competitors (10.8 %).

Individual

Teams

Standard 
The Standard division had the second largest match participation with 249 competitors (36.4 %).

Individual

Teams

See also 
IPSC Rifle World Shoots
IPSC Shotgun World Shoot
IPSC Action Air World Shoot

References

Match Results (Full Individual) - 1999 Handgun World Shoot, Philippines

 

1999
Sports in Cebu
1999 in shooting sports
Shooting competitions in the Philippines
1999 in Philippine sport
International sports competitions hosted by the Philippines